Rachel A. Rosen is a physicist and Associate Professor of Theoretical Physics at Columbia University. Her research involves quantum field theory, cosmology, astrophysics and massive gravity. In particular, she has investigated the problem of the inconsistencies known as "ghosts," and how to formulate models of massive gravity that avoid them.

Education and career 
Rosen received her undergraduate degree in Mathematics and Physics from Brown University. At New York University, she studied the Bullet Cluster with Glennys Farrar and helium-core white dwarfs with Gregory Gabadadze. She received her PhD from that institution in 2009. In 2013, she received a Blavatnik Award for a Young Scientist for work on massive gravity. She is a visiting fellow at the Perimeter Institute for Theoretical Physics.

In July 2017, the Simons Foundation announced that Gabadadze, Rosen and Claudia de Rham would lead a "Cosmology Beyond Einstein's Gravity" research effort as part of the Foundation's new cosmology initiative.

Select technical publications

References

External links
 

Living people
21st-century American physicists
Columbia University faculty
Brown University alumni
New York University alumni
1993 births